Harold Greetham (7 March 1930 – December 2018) was an English professional footballer who played as a full-back.

References

1930 births
2018 deaths
Footballers from Grimsby
English footballers
Association football fullbacks
Grimsby Town F.C. players
Skegness Town A.F.C. players
English Football League players